Theodor Alphons Laurezzari (born 18 May 1880, date of death unknown) was a German rower. He competed in the men's eight event at the 1900 Summer Olympics.

References

External links

1880 births
Year of death missing
German male rowers
Olympic rowers of Germany
Rowers at the 1900 Summer Olympics
Place of birth missing
Place of death missing